Responsibility for law enforcement in Togo is primarily shared by the Police nationale, the civilian national police, and the paramilitary Gendarmerie nationale togolaise.

Police

The Direction de la Police Nationale is commanded by a Director-general, who answers to the Minister of Security and Civil Defence. The force numbers about 4000 male and female members, serving throughout the country.

Its main responsibilities are law enforcement, protection of people and property, prevention of delinquency and maintenance of public order.

Gendarmerie

The Gendarmerie Nationale Togolaise is the national paramilitary police force of Togo.

References

Sources
 World Police Encyclopedia, ed. by Dilip K. Das & Michael Palmiotto.  by Taylor & Francis. 2004,  
 World Encyclopedia of Police Forces and Correctional Systems, 2nd.  edition,  Gale., 2006
 Sullivan, Larry E. et al.  Encyclopedia of Law Enforcement. Thousand Oaks: Sage Publications, 2005.
 

 
Law of Togo